USS LST-865 was a  in the United States Navy during World War II. She was transferred to the Philippine Navy as RPS Albay (T-39).

Construction and career 
LST-865 was laid down on 19 October 1944 at Jeffersonville Boat and Machine Co., Jeffersonville, Indiana. Launched on 22 November 1944 and commissioned on 16 December 1944.

Service in the United States Navy 
During World War II, LST-865 was assigned to the Asiatic-Pacific theater. She was assigned to occupation and Far East from 3 September to 15 December 1947.

She was decommissioned on 30 Decommissioned 1947.

LST-865 was struck from the Navy Register on 22 January 1948 and transferred to the Philippines.

Service in the Philippine Navy 
She was acquired by the Philippine Navy on 30 December 1976 and renamed RPS Albay (T-39).

During the Korean War, RPS Pampanga, RPS Bulacan, BRP Albay, and  had been sent to transport Filipino soldiers to and from Korea for five years. Albay and Bulacan conducted anti-aircraft and anti-submarine drills with a U.S. Navy submarine which surfaced next to Albay. Both ships then anchored at the Port of Busan, 12 days after they departed Manila. She made trips from 1953 to 1954 carrying troops to and back from Korea.

On 19 April 1974, a 20 day marathon on bicycles named Tour of Luzon-Visayas with 200 participants boarded the ship at South Harbor in order to continue the marathon in Tolosa.

RPS Albay, Bulacan and Misamis Oriental were all mothballed in 1979.

Awards 
LST-865 have earned the following awards:

American Campaign Medal
Asiatic-Pacific Campaign Medal (1 battle star) 
World War II Victory Medal
Navy Occupation Service Medal (with Asia clasp)
China Service Medal (extended)

Citations

Sources 
 
 
 
 

World War II amphibious warfare vessels of the United States
Ships built in Jeffersonville, Indiana
1944 ships
LST-542-class tank landing ships
Korean War amphibious warfare vessels of the Philippines
LST-542-class tank landing ships of the Philippine Navy